A survey township, sometimes called a Congressional township or just township, as used by the United States Public Land Survey System, is a nominally-square area of land that is nominally six U.S. survey miles (about 9.66 km) on a side. Each 36-square-mile (about 93.2 km2) township is divided into 36 sections of one square mile (640 acres, roughly 2.6 km2) each. The sections can be further subdivided for sale.

The townships are referenced by a numbering system that locates the township in relation to a principal meridian (north-south) and a base line (east-west). For example, Township 2 North, Range 4 East is the 4th township east of the principal meridian and the 2nd township north of the base line. Township (exterior) lines were originally surveyed and platted by the US General Land Office using contracted private survey crews. Later survey crews subdivided the townships into section (interior) lines. Virtually all lands covered by this system were sold according to those boundaries and are marked on the U.S. Geological Survey topographic maps.

History 
These are often known as Congressional Townships.

Sections are divided into quarter-sections of  each and quarter-quarter sections of  each. In the Homestead Act of 1862, one quarter-section of land was the amount allocated to each settler. Stemming from that are the idiomatic expressions, "the lower 40", the 40 acres on a settler's land that is lowest in elevation, in the direction towards which water drains toward a stream, and the "back forty", the portion farthest from the settler's dwelling.

Survey township vs. civil township 
Survey townships are distinct from civil townships. A survey township is used to establish boundaries for land ownership, while a civil township is a form of local government. In states with civil townships, the two types of townships often coincide. County lines, especially in western states, usually follow survey township lines, leading to the large number of rectangular counties in the Midwest, which are agglomerations of survey townships.

In western Canada, the Dominion Land Survey adopted a similar format for survey townships, which do not form administrative units. These townships also have the area of 36 square miles (six miles by six miles).

See also
 Township
 Township (United States)
 Charter township (Michigan)
 Paper township (Ohio)

References

Further reading
The Public Land Survey System Study Guide: The foundational concepts and terminology of the Rectangular Survey System, Bureau of Land Management

Surveying of the United States
Political divisions of the United States
Surveying
Townships in the United States
Units of area
Customary units of measurement in the United States